Alla Davydova, née Fyodorova (born 21 May 1966 in Bishkek) is a retired female hammer thrower from Russia. At the time, this throw set a world record for the women's 35–40 age group.

International competitions

References

1966 births
Living people
Sportspeople from Bishkek
Russian female hammer throwers
Soviet female hammer throwers
Olympic female hammer throwers
Olympic athletes of Russia
Athletes (track and field) at the 2000 Summer Olympics
World Athletics Championships athletes for Russia
Russian Athletics Championships winners